Volz is a surname, and people with the surname include:

 Albert Volz (1871-1971), American businessman and politician
 Chris Volz (born 1973), American songwriter and lead vocalist of Flaw
 David Volz (born 1962), American pole vaulter
 Eric Volz (born 1979)
 Ferdinand E. Volz (1823–1876), mayor of Pittsburgh, Pennsylvania, 1854–1856
 Greg X. Volz (born 1950), Christian rock singer
 Helmut Volz (1911–1978), German experimental nuclear physicist
 Jacob Volz (1889–1965), Philippine–American War Medal of Honor recipient
 John Volz (1935–2011), attorney for the United States District Court for the Eastern District of Louisiana, prosecuted high-profile corruption cases
 Robert Volz (1875–?), American Medal of Honor recipient
 Moritz Volz (born 1983), German footballer
 Nedra Volz (1908–2003), American actress
 Wilbur Volz (1924–2015), American football halfback

See also
 Voltz (disambiguation)